Ernest Bradford "Mick" Hole (September 2, 1900 – March 11, 1969), also recorded as "Mickey Hole", was an American football Back who played two seasons in the American Professional Football Association with the Muncie Flyers.

References

External links
Just Sports Stats

1900 births
1969 deaths
American football running backs
American football defensive backs
Muncie Flyers players
Players of American football from Ohio
People from Celina, Ohio